The Toronto 228th Battalion (NHA) was an ice hockey team, composed entirely of troops in the 228th (Northern Fusiliers) Battalion of the Canadian Expeditionary Force, in the National Hockey Association (fore-runner to the modern NHL) for the 1916–17 season.

The Battalion assumed the place of the former Toronto Shamrocks franchise, which had been dormant since the end of the 1914–15 season, and played out of the Mutual Street Arena.

Also known as the Northern Fusiliers, the team played wearing khaki military uniforms and was the league's most popular and highest scoring club until the unit was ordered overseas in February 1917 and the team was forced to withdraw. A scandal ensued when several stars were subsequently discharged and alleged they had been promised commissions solely to play hockey.

The NHA then sued the military for $3000 and some game revenues due to the team leaving the league. This lawsuit was not successful.

Team roster

Results

See also
 National Hockey Association
 Toronto Tecumsehs

References

 
 

Ice hockey teams in Ontario
Military sport in Canada
National Hockey Association teams
Ba
Military ice hockey teams
1916 establishments in Ontario
1917 disestablishments in Ontario
Ice hockey clubs established in 1916
Ice hockey clubs disestablished in 1917